Consolation is the act of offering comfort to someone who has suffered loss.

Consolation(s) may also refer to:

Music 
 Consolation (band), a Dutch death metal/grindcore band
 Consolation (album) by Kalafina, 2013
 Consolation (EP), by Protomartyr, 2018
 "Consolation" (song), by the Hep Stars, 1966
 "Consolation", a song by Vertical Horizon from Echoes from the Underground, 2013
 Consolations (Liszt), six piano pieces by Liszt, 1850

Other uses
 Awake!, formerly Consolation, a Jehova's Witnesses magazine
 Seneca's Consolations, three works by Seneca c. 40–45 AD

See also
 Basilica and National Shrine of Our Lady of Consolation
 Consolation payment, to relatives of civilians who have died accidentally
 Consolation prize